The Sinoe River is a river of Liberia located in Sinoe County.
The river forms the western boundary of Sapo National Park.

References 

Rivers of Liberia
Sinoe County